Anton Andreasson (born 26 July 1993) is a Swedish footballer who plays for Örgryte IS as a midfielder., where he signed a short-term contract in August 2018 after spending a year in Jönköpings Södra He is the son of former IF Elfsborg and Como midfielder Stefan Andreasson, who since 1999 serves as the director of IF Elfsborg.

References

External links

1993 births
Living people
Association football midfielders
IF Elfsborg players
Östers IF players
Jönköpings Södra IF players
Örgryte IS players
Swedish footballers
Allsvenskan players
Superettan players